Tonight Is Ours is a 1933 American Pre-Code drama film directed by Stuart Walker and starring Claudette Colbert, Fredric March and Alison Skipworth. Made by Paramount Pictures, it is based on the play The Queen Was in the Parlour by Noël Coward.

Cast
Claudette Colbert as Princess Nadya
Fredric March as Sabien Pastal
Alison Skipworth as Grand Duchess Emilie
Arthur Byron as Gen. Krish
Paul Cavanagh as Prince Keri
Ethel Griffies as Zana
Clay Clement as Seminoff
Warburton Gamble as Alex
Edwin Maxwell as mob leader

See also
The Queen Was in the Parlour (1927)

Notes

External links

 
 

1933 films
1930s romantic comedy-drama films
American romantic comedy-drama films
Films directed by Stuart Walker
American films based on plays
American black-and-white films
Paramount Pictures films
Films set in Paris
Films set in Europe
American remakes of British films
Sound film remakes of silent films
1933 comedy films
1933 drama films
Films scored by Karl Hajos
1930s English-language films
1930s American films